Priit Viks (born January 7, 1982 in Tartu) is a retired Estonian biathlete. He competed at the 2006 Winter Olympics in Turin. He represented Estonia at the 2010 Winter Olympics in Vancouver.

References

1982 births
Living people
Sportspeople from Tartu
Estonian male biathletes
Biathletes at the 2006 Winter Olympics
Biathletes at the 2010 Winter Olympics
Olympic biathletes of Estonia